Dereodus is a genus of beetles belonging to the family Curculionidae. Species are distributed throughout India, Sri Lanka, Middle East, Africa and introduced to Australia.

Description
Very similar to the genus Hypomeces. Structure of the eyes is very variable. In male, antennae with joint 7 of the funicle always longer than 6. Prothorax base is either slightly bisinuate or truncate. Sternum without any bifid tubercular prominence behind the anterior coxae. Legs with tarsi varying in width where the trochanters are without the solitary long bristle.

Many species are known to damage leaves of Vachellia nilotica.

Species
 Dereodus albofasciatus Magnano, 2009
 Dereodus andamanensis Marshall, 1916
 Dereodus curtus (Boheman, 1840)
 Dereodus cylindricollis Gestro, 1892
 Dereodus denticollis Boheman, 1834
 Dereodus elegantulus Hustache, 1924
 Dereodus elongatus Gestro, 1892
 Dereodus macularius (Pascoe, 1883)
 Dereodus marginellus (Boheman, 1834)
 Dereodus mastos (Herbst, 1797)
 Dereodus mesopotamicus (Pic, 1896)
 Dereodus pauper Dalman, 1834
 Dereodus phasianellus Fairmaire, 1886
 Dereodus polliosus Redtenbacher, 1844
 Dereodus pulverosus Marshall, 1916
 Dereodus reticollis Marshall, 1909
 Dereodus schoenherri Faust, 1885
 Dereodus sitonoides (Pic, 1896)
 Dereodus sparsus Boheman, 1840
 Dereodus striatopunctatus Fairmaire, 1887
 Dereodus subroseus Faust, 1895
 Dereodus trisulcatus (Voss, 1922)
 Dereodus uhlenhethi Hustache, 1936
 Dereodus vagabundus Faust, 1885
 Dereodus vigilans Marshall, 1916

References

Curculionidae
Curculionidae genera